2nd Earl of Warwick may refer to:

Roger de Beaumont, 2nd Earl of Warwick  (1102 – 11153)
John Dudley, 2nd Earl of Warwick (c. 1527 – 1554)
Robert Rich, 2nd Earl of Warwick (1587 – 1658)
George Greville, 2nd Earl of Warwick  (1746 – 1816)

See also
Earl of Warwick